Dysphania prunicolor is a moth of the family Geometridae first described by Frederic Moore in 1879. It is found in India and may be found in Sri Lanka.

References

Moths of Asia
Moths described in 1879